Klébert Balmat (22 June 1896 – 2 July 1961) was a French skier. He competed at the 1924 Winter Olympics and the 1928 Winter Olympics.

References

External links
 

1896 births
1961 deaths
French male ski jumpers
French male Nordic combined skiers
Olympic ski jumpers of France
Olympic Nordic combined skiers of France
Ski jumpers at the 1924 Winter Olympics
Ski jumpers at the 1928 Winter Olympics
Nordic combined skiers at the 1924 Winter Olympics
Nordic combined skiers at the 1928 Winter Olympics
Place of birth missing